Jabavu is a surname. Notable people with the name include:

Davidson Don Tengo Jabavu (1885–1959), Bantu political activist and author
John Tengo Jabavu (1859–1921), South African writers and political activist 
Noni Jabavu (1919–2008), South African writer and journalist

Xhosa-language surnames